Grimsby Rugby Union Football Club is an English rugby union team based in Grimsby, North East Lincolnshire. The first XV currently plays in Midlands 3 East (North) following the club's promotion from Midlands 4 East (North) as champions at the end of the 2018–19 season. The club runs three senior sides and five junior sides. They currently hold the record for most titles in Midlands 3 East (North) with two titles (equalling the records of Oakham and Ashbourne).

History
Grimsby RUFC was founded in 1885, with Walter Alford Green being appointed as the club's first president. The new club played their first game against Hull and East Riding RUFC. Grimsby went on to lose this game. The club formed on a proper basis in January 1923. The first game as an official club was played away at Gainsborough. Grimsby won the game by 31 points to 5. Many of the club's early home games were played at Charlton's, on Littlefield Lane.

The club managed to secure their own pitch a little while later, at Fairfield in the Scartho area of Grimsby. After this, the club played Gainsborough again, this time at home. Grimsby won this match too, by 62 points to zero. This game was watched by over 2,000 spectators.

The club changed grounds many times after the Second World War. First, they played on land at the bottom of Peakes Lane. They then moved to the land on Barratts Recreation Ground, behind the Scartho Road Swimming Pool. It was decided that the club needed a new ground in 1961 however, and after a large amount of fundraising by club members, and help from the Earl of Yarborough, the club moved to its current location of Springfield.

Honours
Notts, Lincs & Derbyshire 1 champions: 1992–93
Midlands 4 East (North) champions: 2018–19

Squad

First XV

Second XV
Players from the First XV will sometimes drop down to the Second XV to complete the side.

Personnel

Club Officials
President:  Stuart Connett
Chairperson:   Martin Simons
Junior Chairman:  Glen Norman
Director of Rugby/Head Coach:  Fred Prendagast
Coach:  Andy Picking
Coach:  Phil Dyson
Coach:  Mike Newman
Coach:  Martin Simons

Past Captains

References

External links

Grimsby
Sport in Grimsby
English rugby union teams
Rugby union in Lincolnshire
Rugby clubs established in 1885
1885 establishments in England